Valur Fannar Gíslason (born 8 September 1977) is an Icelandic former footballer who played for a defender and midfielder.

Club career
Born in Reykjavík, Valur played for Fram, Arsenal, Brighton & Hove Albion, Strømsgodset, Fylkir, Valur, Haukar and Vatnaliljur.

International career
Valur represented Iceland at under-16, under-17, under-19 and under-21 youth levels, and also earned 5 caps for the senior team.

References

1977 births
Living people
Valur Gislason
Valur Gislason
Valur Gislason
Valur Gislason
Valur Gislason
Arsenal F.C. players
Brighton & Hove Albion F.C. players
Valur Gislason
Valur Gislason
Valur Gislason
Valur Gislason
English Football League players
Eliteserien players
Valur Gislason
Valur Gislason
Valur Gislason
Expatriate footballers in England
Valur Gislason
Expatriate footballers in Norway
Strømsgodset Toppfotball players
Association football defenders
Association football midfielders